Chet is an album by jazz trumpeter Chet Baker first released in 1959. The record is sometimes subtitled The Lyrical Trumpet of Chet Baker. Chet features performances by Baker with alto flautist Herbie Mann, baritone saxophonist Pepper Adams, pianist Bill Evans, guitarist Kenny Burrell, bassist Paul Chambers, and either Connie Kay (on six tracks) or Philly Joe Jones (on four tracks) playing drums. It was recorded in December 1958 and January 1959 and released on the Riverside label.

Though Baker was by the late 1950s known as much for his singing as his trumpet playing, this album is entirely instrumental. It contains 9 standard ballads (and the Chet Baker composition "Early Morning Mood" as an additional bonus track on the CD version) played in the styles of Hard Bop to Cool Jazz. Though the album is entirely devoted to explorations of the ballad mood, it includes considerable variety.

The Chambers-Evans-Jones rhythm section was known at the time for their work with trumpeter Miles Davis.

Reception
The Allmusic review by Dave Nathan awarded the album 4 stars and states: "Chet is a good album to hear Baker's special way with the horn, and is made even more attractive with the presence and contributions of top jazz artists".

Track listing
 "Alone Together" (Howard Dietz, Arthur Schwartz) - 6:46  
 "How High the Moon" (Nancy Hamilton, Morgan Lewis) - 3:31  
 "It Never Entered My Mind" (Lorenz Hart, Richard Rodgers) - 4:36  
 "'Tis Autumn" (Henry Nemo) - 5:12  
 "If You Could See Me Now" (Tadd Dameron, Carl Sigman) - 5:11  
 "September Song" (Maxwell Anderson, Kurt Weill) - 3:00  
 "You'd Be So Nice to Come Home To" (Cole Porter) - 4:38  
 "Time on My Hands (You in My Arms)" (Vincent Youmans, Harold Adamson, Mack Gordon) - 4:27  
 "You and the Night and the Music" (Howard Dietz, Arthur Schwartz) - 3:50  
 "Early Morning Mood" (Chet Baker) - 9:02 Bonus track on CD
Recorded in New York City on December 30, 1958 (tracks 1-3 & 5-7), and January 19, 1959 (tracks 4 & 8-10).

Personnel

References

1959 albums
Riverside Records albums
Albums produced by Orrin Keepnews
Chet Baker albums